Jackson Township is one of twelve townships in Rush County, Indiana. As of the 2010 census, its population was 366 and it contained 146 housing units.

History
Jackson Township was organized in 1830.

The Smith Covered Bridge was listed on the National Register of Historic Places in 1983.

Geography

Unincorporated towns
 Henderson at 
 Occident at 
(This list is based on USGS data and may include former settlements.)

References

External links
 Indiana Township Association
 United Township Association of Indiana

Townships in Rush County, Indiana
Townships in Indiana